The 23rd GLAAD Media Awards was the 2012 annual presentation of the GLAAD Media Awards, presented by the Gay & Lesbian Alliance Against Defamation honoring the 2011 season. The awards seek to honor films, television shows, musicians and works of journalism that fairly and accurately represent the LGBT community and issues relevant to the community.  The 23rd Annual GLAAD Media Awards honored nominees in 25 English-language categories and 10 Spanish-language categories.

Awards were presented in three separate ceremonies: in New York City on March 24, 2012; in Los Angeles on April 21, 2012; and in San Francisco on June 2, 2012.  The New York City awards were hosted by Naya Rivera and Cory Monteith, with special performances by Todd Alsup, Corey Craig, Whitney Day, and The Rockettes.

Nominees
Winners are presented in bold.

English-language categories

Spanish-language categories

References

23rd
GLAAD
2012 in LGBT history
2012 in New York City
2012 in Los Angeles
2012 in San Francisco
Lists of LGBT-related award winners and nominees